James Hugh Edendale Whitehead (8 July 1890 – 13 March 1919) was an English first-class cricketer active 1912 who played in a single match for Marylebone Cricket Club (MCC). He played Second XI cricket for Kent. He was the brother of George Whitehead.

References

1890 births
1919 deaths
English cricketers
Marylebone Cricket Club cricketers